John van Wyhe (born 1971) is a British historian of science, with a focus on Charles Darwin and Alfred Russel Wallace, at the National University of Singapore. He holds various academic and research positions, ranging from founder and director of The Complete Works of Charles Darwin Online, Scientific Associate, The Natural History Museum (London), a Fellow of the Linnean Society and a Member of the British Society for the History of Science. He has given more than 50 public lectures on Darwin in more than a dozen countries. He lectures and broadcasts on Darwin, evolution, science and religion and the history of science around the world. He also wrote The Darwin Experience, a biographical book about Charles Darwin.

Van Wyhe has an M.A. from University College London and a Ph.D. from the University of Cambridge. He accepted a Senior Research Fellowship at the National University of Singapore in 2002 where he both founded the Darwin Online project and edited the Science section of the Victorian Web.

A new edition of his 2008 biography of Darwin, Darwin: The Man, His Great Voyage, and His Theory of Evolution, appeared under the banner of the Natural History Museum in 2018.

Research 
For the Darwin bicentenary year of 2009, van Wyhe published four books on Darwin: Darwin's Shorter Publications; Darwin's Notebooks from the Voyage of the Beagle; Darwin in Cambridge; and an accessible biography: Darwin.

Recent projects include challenging the assumed view that Darwin held back or kept his theory secret for twenty years and restoring Darwin's student rooms at Christ's College, Cambridge.

In addition to maintaining Darwin Online, van Wyhe had an interest in the history of phrenology and has given talks on this in Britain, France, and Germany.

Darwin and religion 
One of van Wyhe's areas of research covers the reception of evolutionary ideas, and in an article titled "Darwin vs God?" he put forward the case  that Darwin was neither an atheist nor was there a significant uproar of science and religion when The Origin of Species was published, though heterogeneity of opinion existed.

Selected works  

 Darwin: A Companion. World Scientific. 2021.
 Charles Darwin: The Compact Guide. Welbecck, 2020. 
 On the Origin of Species. With an introduction by John van Wyhe. 2020.
 Wanderlust: The Amazing Ida Pfeiffer, the First Female Tourist. NUS Press. 2019.
 Darwin: The Man, His Great Voyage, and His Theory of Evolution. (Andre Deutsch: UK 2018).
 The Annotated Malay Archipelago by Alfred Russel Wallace. Edited [annotated and introduced] by John van Wyhe, NUS Press, 2015.
 Charles Darwin in Cambridge: The Most Joyful Years. World Scientific Press, 2014.
 Dispelling the Darkness: Voyage in the Malay Archipelago and the Discovery of Evolution by Wallace and Darwin. World Scientific Press, 2013.
 Alfred Russel Wallace: Letters from the Malay Archipelago. Forward by Sir David Attenborough. Oxford University Press, 2013.
 Darwin. (Andre Deutsch: UK 2008, National Geographic: USA, 2009). [Translated into French and Spanish]
 Charles Darwin's Shorter Publications 1829-1883. [Foreword by Janet Browne and Jim Secord] (Cambridge University Press, 2009).
 Charles Darwin's Notebooks from the Voyage of the Beagle. [Foreword by Richard Darwin Keynes] (Cambridge University Press, forthcoming July 2009, with Gordon Chancellor and Kees Rookmaaker).
 Darwin in Cambridge (Cambridge: Christ's College: 2009).
 Phrenology and the Origins of Victorian Scientific Naturalism. Ashgate, 2004.
 Combe's Constitution of Man, and Nineteenth-Century Responses. 3 vols. By George Combe, edited by John van Wyhe, Thoemmes Press, 2004.

References

1971 births
Living people
Historians of science
Academic staff of the National University of Singapore
Charles Darwin biographers
Critics of creationism